David Sherwin (August 5, 1950 – July 20, 2012), better known by his ring name Goldie Rogers, was a Canadian professional wrestler born in Cobourg, Ontario.

Professional wrestling career
Dave Sherwin trained with Phil Watson in April 1972 and debuted later that summer. He started his career wrestling under various masked gimmicks in multiple small promotions in Ontario, before heading to West Virginia and becoming the Hollywood villain persona 'Goldie Rogers'. Rogers worked in various territories including Jim Crockett Promotions in the Mid-Atlantic, Dean Silverstone's Superstar Championship Wrestling in Washington, Al Tomko's All-Star Wrestling in Vancouver, Frank Tunney's Maple Leaf Wrestling in Toronto and in a few promotions in Canada's Maritimes. He also wrestled in various televised enhancement matches for the World Wrestling Federation in the early to mid 1980s.

In the mid to late 1980s, Rogers became a fixture of Stu Hart's Stampede Wrestling in Calgary, Alberta and was known for his stalling ring antics, bushy beard, colourful sunglasses, flashy ring attire and 'Listen up Jack!' catch phrase with his raspy voice. The promotion closed in December 1989, and Rogers returned to wrestling in the Maritimes, retiring in 1992. After retiring he started up "Call-A-Cab" taxi service in his hometown of Cobourg. On October 1, 2002 he married Faith Forget. He died in July 2012.

References

External links
Goldie Rogers at Online World of Wrestling
Hometown Honours Goldie Rogers at Slam! Wrestling
Listen Up Jack! Goldie Rogers Stories at Slam! Wrestling

2012 deaths
Canadian male professional wrestlers
People from Cobourg
1950 births
Professional wrestlers from Ontario
Stampede Wrestling alumni